Victor Buga (born 26 June 1994) is a Moldovan professional footballer who plays as a goalkeeper for Milsami Orhei.

References

External links
Buga at sports.md

1994 births
Living people
Footballers from Chișinău
Moldovan footballers
Moldova under-21 international footballers
Association football goalkeepers
Moldovan Super Liga players
FC Zimbru Chișinău players
CS Petrocub Hîncești players
Liga II players
ACS Viitorul Târgu Jiu players
Moldovan expatriate footballers
Moldovan expatriate sportspeople in Romania
Expatriate footballers in Romania